Lauren Amanda Silver (born 22 March 1993) is an American-born Jamaican professional footballer who last played as a defender for Houston Dash of the National Women's Soccer League (NWSL) and the Jamaica women's national football team.

Early life
Silver was born in Miami, Florida, on 22 March 1993. Her parents were both marathon runners, while her sister also played soccer and encouraged her to take up the sport. She attended American Heritage School in Delray Beach, Florida, where she won state soccer championships in 2010 and 2011. She joined the US Youth Soccer Olympic Development Program in 2008.

College career
Between 2011 and 2014, Silver attended the University of Florida and played on the Florida Gators women's soccer team.

Club career
Silver joined the Houston Dash of the National Women's Soccer League (NWSL) as a trialist during their 2015 pre-season. She went on to sign with Bollstanäs SK in Sweden's second division Elitettan, where she was a starting player in eight matches and scored one goal during the 2015 season. She scored a goal for the team during the 2015 Swedish Women's Cup.

Silver joined NWSL team, FC Kansas City, on their 2016 pre-season roster. She played for French Division 1 Féminine club, FC Metz, making four appearances, before joining Glasgow City of the Scottish Women's Premier League in March 2017. She left the club two months later, having reportedly failed to adapt to the conditions in Scotland. She signed a one-year professional contract with Norwegian Toppserien club SK Trondheims-Ørn in February 2019. She rejoined Houston Dash on a short-term contract in September 2020.

International career
Although born in the United States, Silver qualified to represent Jamaica through her maternal grandfather. She made her international debut in the 2014 CONCACAF Women's Championship. In 2019, she was named to the squad to represent Jamaica at their first FIFA Women's World Cup in France. She made her tournament debut during the team's 5–0 loss against Italy in the group stage.

International goals
Scores and results list Jamaica's goal tally first

References

External links

 Player profile at 2019 FIFA Women's World Cup
 Player profile at SK Trondheims-Ørn
 

1993 births
Living people
Citizens of Jamaica through descent
Jamaican women's footballers
Women's association football defenders
Women's association football midfielders
FC Metz (women) players
Glasgow City F.C. players
Division 1 Féminine players
Toppserien players
Jamaica women's international footballers
2019 FIFA Women's World Cup players
Pan American Games competitors for Jamaica
Footballers at the 2019 Pan American Games
Jamaican people of American descent
Jamaican expatriate women's footballers
Jamaican expatriate sportspeople in Sweden
Expatriate women's footballers in Sweden
Jamaican expatriate sportspeople in France
Expatriate women's footballers in France
Jamaican expatriate sportspeople in Scotland
Expatriate women's footballers in Scotland
Jamaican expatriate sportspeople in Norway
Expatriate women's footballers in Norway
Soccer players from Miami
American women's soccer players
Florida Gators women's soccer players
Houston Dash players
African-American women's soccer players
American sportspeople of Jamaican descent
American expatriate women's soccer players
American expatriate sportspeople in Sweden
American expatriate sportspeople in France
American expatriate sportspeople in Scotland
American expatriate sportspeople in Norway
21st-century African-American sportspeople
21st-century African-American women